The 1989 Mantegazza Cup was a women's tennis tournament played on outdoor clay courts in Taranto, Italy that was part of the Category 1 tier of the 1989 WTA Tour. It was the third edition of the tournament and was held from 1 May until 7 May 1989. Unseeded Karine Quentrec won the singles title.

Finals

Singles

 Karine Quentrec defeated  Cathy Caverzasio 6–3, 5–7, 6–3
 It was Quentrec's only singles title of her career.

Doubles

 Sabrina Goleš /  Mercedes Paz defeated  Sophie Amiach /  Emmanuelle Derly 6–2, 6–2
 It was Goleš' only title of the year and the 4th of her career. It was Paz's 1st title of the year and the 13th of her career.

References

External links
 ITF tournament edition details
 Tournament draws

Mantegazza Cup
Ilva Trophy
1989 in Italian tennis
Mantegazza Cup
1989 in Italian women's sport